Pascal Foucart is a French artist born in the sixties and living in Paris, France. He became a painter in 1982, choosing to express himself with colors, expanding the works of artists like Jackson Pollock, one of his few "masters".
His other passion is astronomy; so he drops his colors like constellations, the Milky Way and supernovae on canvas but also on many supports as such as naked bodies, clothes and objects.
Involved in the "59 Rivoli" artistic movement based in the center of Paris founded in 1999, he is also a member of the Maison des Artistes since 2000.
Pascal Foucart is also involved in ethics and humanist ideals. He wants to bring his artistic works to a very wide number of people, event those who have just enough to live.

Some of his main exhibitions 
 Musée du Louvre. Paris (France). Exhibition, performance and conferences relating to : The origin of light in paintings and influences of astronomy in arts.
 Galerie de l’horloge, Paris (France)
 Ecomusee de Savigny Le Temple (France)
 Galerie Centre d’Art en l’île, Geneva (Switzerland)
 Galerie La Goudera (verena fondation), Hydra (Greece)
 Studio Derek Williams Bateman street, London (UK)
 Galerie Art Generation. Lyon and Paris (France)

Some Fashion runways (original paintings on clothes) 
 Palais des Congrès, Dijon (France)
 Galerie Centre D’Art en l’île, Geneva (Switzerland)
 Verena Fondation, Hydra (Greece)
 Galerie Art Generation. Lyon and Paris (France)

External links 
 Official website of this artiste
 .

Abstract expressionist artists
20th-century French painters
20th-century French male artists
French male painters
21st-century French painters
Living people
1961 births